Black seed may refer to:
 Nigella sativa, a plant with stubby, 2mm seeds
 Guizotia abyssinica, a plant with elongate, 5mm seeds
 Black Seed (EP), an EP by black metal band Nazxul
 Black Seed (film), a 1971 film